Sofia Jarl (born 1977 with the last name Karlsson) is a Swedish politician. She is a member of the Centre Party.

References
This article was initially translated from the Swedish Wikipedia article.

Swedish republicans
Centre Party (Sweden) politicians
1977 births
Living people
Feminist Initiative (Sweden) politicians